Nahar Khvoran (also Romanized as Nahār Khvorān; also known as Nahār Khorān) is a Forest in south of Gorgan County, Golestan Province, Iran. 
This forest is one of the tourist attractions in the north of Iran.

Gallery

References 

Populated places in Gorgan County